Philip Collins Ltd v Davis [2000] 3 All ER 808 is an English unjust enrichment case, an example of a restitution claim and the change of position defence.

Facts
Phil Collins released Serious Hits… Live! with 15 tracks in 1990. Rahmlee Davis and Louis Satterfield contributed performances on five tracks and received album royalties via Collins' publishing company Philip Collins Ltd. In 1997, Collins said they had been mistakenly overpaid by a factor of three. They had been paid as if they had performed on all fifteen tracks, but they had only performed on five. To reverse this alleged unjust enrichment, Collins proposed to set off the overpaid royalties on future royalties. Davis and Satterfield argued back they were entitled to royalties without the pro rata reduction, and raised both estoppel and change of position defences.

Judgment
Jonathan Parker J held Collins had overpaid Davis and Satterfield and he was entitled to set future royalties off against half of the sums overpaid. He said the overpayment was a mistake of fact, because Collins thought they had played in all 15 tracks. Collins was not estopped from maintaining there was overpayment of royalties because there was never any assumption between the parties that Davis and Satterfield would get royalties for all 15 tracks and there was no acquiescence in the assumption. Overpayment was not acquiescence. There was no evidence Davis and Satterfield ever thought they were entitled. The overpayments did not amount to representations that they were (so no estoppel by representation). But the fact of overpayment did result in a general change of position on Davis and Satterfield's part. It increased their level of outgoings. However, the defence of change of position was not an “all or nothing” doctrine and, in this case, it would be fair to allow the defence to cover one half of the overpayments (Lipkin Gorman v Karpnale Ltd [1991] 2 AC 548 applied). Finally, if Collins had made a claim to recover the overpayments his claim would have been statute barred under the Limitation Act 1980, s.5 because it was six years. But here it was not a return of overpayments, only an equitable set off against future royalties.

The following is an excerpt about the change of position defence at work.

See also
English unjust enrichment

Notes

English unjust enrichment case law
High Court of Justice cases
2000 in case law
2000 in British law
Phil Collins